is a Japanese football player for Kochi United SC.

Career
After attending Funabashi Municipal High School, Hasegawa joined Mito HollyHock in October 2017 for the successive season.

Club statistics
Updated to end of 2020 season.

References

External links

Profile at J. League
Profile at Mito HollyHock

1999 births
Living people
Association football people from Tokyo
Japanese footballers
J2 League players
J3 League players
Mito HollyHock players
Azul Claro Numazu players
Association football goalkeepers